Stephen Henry Morrison  (May 22, 1866 – September 30, 1927), was a professional baseball player who played pitcher in the Major Leagues for the 1887 Indianapolis Hoosiers of the National League. He played minor league baseball in the Tri-State League from 1888-1890.

External links

1866 births
1927 deaths
Major League Baseball pitchers
Indianapolis Hoosiers (NL) players
Baseball players from Rhode Island
19th-century baseball players
Newburyport Clamdiggers players
Biddeford (minor league baseball) players
Lawrence (minor league baseball) players
Wheeling National Citys players
Wheeling Nailers (baseball) players
Mansfield (minor league baseball) players